Ilyocoris is a genus of true bugs belonging to the family Naucoridae.

Species:
 Ilyocoris cimicoides (Linnaeus, 1758)
 Ilyocoris rottensis Schlechtendal, 1899

References

Naucoridae